is a women's volleyball team based in Kobe city, Hyogo and Tosu city, Saga, Japan. It plays in V.League 1. The club was founded in 1948. 

In July 2020 the team announced an official name change from "Hisamitsu Pharmaceutical Springs" to "Hisamitsu Springs" and unveiled a new team mascot and logo.  On August 7, 2020 Hisamitsu Springs concluded " a cooperation agreement with Tosu City to further revitalize the region and economy through the volleyball business, and we will proceed with concrete efforts".

Hisamitsu Springs won the V.Premier League final for the seventh time on April 13, 2018, beating Toray Arrows.

The owner of the team is Hisamitsu Pharmaceutical.

Honours
Japan Volleyball League/V.League/V.Premiere League
Champions (9): 2001-2002, 2006–2007, 2012-2013, 2013-2014, 2015-2016, 2017-2018, 2018-2019, 2021-2022
Runners-up (6): 2000-2001, 2005–2006, 2008–2009, 2011-2012, 2014-2015, 2016-2017
Kurowashiki All Japan Volleyball Championship
Champions (3): 2006, 2007 and 2013
Runner-up (1): 2009
Empress's Cup
Champions (8): 2009, 2012, 2013, 2014, 2015, 2016, 2018, 2021
Runners-up (1): 2007-08
Domestic Sports Festival (Volleyball)
Champions (5): 1980, 1983, 1986, 1989 and 2012
Runners-up (3): 2011, 2014 and 2016
AVC Club Volleyball Championship
Champions (2): 2002 and 2014
Runners-up (1): 2015 and 2017

League results

Current squad
2022-2023 squad 

 Head coach:  Shingo Sakai

Former players

Domestic players

Shizuka Hyodo (2007–2009)
Maiko Hanzawa (2007–2009)
Ai Yamamoto (2008-2009)
Aya Mikami (2006–2009)
Eri Tokugawa (2006–2009)
Naoko Hashimoto (2003–2009)
Miki Ishii (2008–2010)
Shuka Oyama (2001–2010)
Miyuki Kano (2006–2010)
Kanako Omura (2000–2010)
Yuko Sano (2006–2010)
Mizuho Ishida (2009–2015)
Kanako Hirai (2007–2014)
Maiko Kano (2012–2015)
Risa Ishibashi (2012–2017
Chizuru Koto (2009–2019)
Akane Ukishima (2015–2018) Transferred to Kurobe AquaFairies
Fumika Moriya (2014–2019) Transferred to Denso Airybees
Sayaka Tsutsui (2016–2019) Transferred to PFU BlueCats
Risa Shinnabe (2009–2020)
Nana Iwasaka (2009–2021)
Kotoki Zayasu (2008–2016, 2017–2021)
Ayano Nakaoji Kojima (2013–2017, 2019–2021)

Foreign players
 
Ana Paula Lopes Ferreira (2006–2007, 2011–2012)
Elisângela Oliveira (2009–2011)
 (2013–2014)
Fabiana Claudino (2019–2020)
 
Nataša Osmokrović (1996–1997)
 
Kenia Carcaces (2005–2006)
 
Yelena Pavlova (2007–2008)
 
Francien Huurman (2002–2003)
 
Brankica Mihajlović (2014–2015)
 
Logan Tom (2008–2009)
Foluke Akinradewo (2017–2019)

References

Japanese volleyball teams
Volleyball clubs established in 1948
1948 establishments in Japan
Sports teams in Kobe
Sports teams in Saga Prefecture